Joan Parkes was an Irish politician. She was elected to represent South Belfast in the 1996 Forum elections under the platform of the Democratic Unionist Party.

She was a member of Belfast City Council from 1985 to 1997.

References

Year of birth missing
Possibly living people
Members of the Northern Ireland Forum
Democratic Unionist Party politicians
Members of Belfast City Council